Affoltern District (also known as Knonaueramt or Säuliamt) is one of the twelve districts of the German-speaking canton of Zürich, Switzerland. Its capital is the city of Affoltern am Albis.

Municipalities 
Affoltern contains a total of 14 municipalities:

See also 

Municipalities of the canton of Zürich

References

Districts of the canton of Zürich